German people may refer to:

 in terms of ethnicity: all ethnic Germans, in and outside of Germany
 in territorial terms: people of Germany, entire population of Germany, historical or modern
 in modern legal terms: all people who poses the citizenship of Germany

Other uses 
 German People's Party
 German People's Party (1868)
 German People's Party (Austria)
 German People's Party (Romania)
 German People's Group in Czecho-Slovakia
 German People's Congress
 German People's Council
 German People's Radio
 German People's Union
 German People's Union (Croatia)
 All-German People's Party
 Greater German People's Party
 German National People's Party

See also 
 German (disambiguation)
 Germany (disambiguation)